Terence Noel O'Brien (23 December 1906 – 19 December 1982) was an English rower, born in Thanet, who competed for Great Britain in the 1928 Summer Olympics.

O'Brien was a member of London Rowing Club. In 1927, partnering Robert Nisbet, he won Silver Goblets at Henley Royal Regatta.  In 1928 the pair were chosen to compete in the coxless pairs for Great Britain rowing at the 1928 Summer Olympics, where they won the silver medal. At the 1930 British Empire Games he was a member of the English eight which won the gold medal.

References

External links
 

1906 births
1982 deaths
People from Thanet (district)
English male rowers
Olympic rowers of Great Britain
Rowers at the 1928 Summer Olympics
Olympic silver medallists for Great Britain
Rowers at the 1930 British Empire Games
Commonwealth Games gold medallists for England
Olympic medalists in rowing
Medalists at the 1928 Summer Olympics
Commonwealth Games medallists in rowing
Medallists at the 1930 British Empire Games